StarDoc 134 is a Dos/Linux hybrid BBS running EleBBS maintained by Andrew Baker aka "RamMan, Dotel and Dotelpenguin".

StarDoc 134 is a Bulletin Board System that started in the 1990s by Andrew Baker as a hobby. The BBS runs in Fresno California on a dedicated Linux Server. The name was originally chosen to be Star Dock 134, however due to a typo on the original promotion material the name was officially changed to "StarDoc" to match the typo. Through the years there has been many changes to the look and feel of the BBS. Making 4 major and dozens of minor software changes in its history, it continues to provide entertainment, information and nostalgia for all who visit it.

StarDoc 134 now runs a variety of old DOS classics ported to the BBS using emulation, access to other BBS's, internet portals, games, doors, and multi-player mud links. Though new development of the system is slow, the BBS continues to run as a type of nostalgia getting a few calls from around the globe a day.

Software and hardware history

Basic
In the early 1990s the BBS ran custom BBS software in Microsoft BASIC. The Software was never named and was simply called "Answer.bas". An 8086 ComputerLand computer and 1200baud modem provided the hardware necessary for the BBS. The BBS had to be manually started by the SysOp and user account manually created. User accounts were hard coded into the system. At this time the BBS only supported a small message system, a few online simple games, no multi user chat or file transfers were available. Despite the small number of features the BBS was in use 75% of the day by callers. The BBS was less than 100k in size and ran off of a 720k floppy disk.
Active 1991-1992

Quick Basic 4.5
About a year after the BBS opened the SysOp Won a copy of Quick Basic 4.5 at a computer show. The BBS was quickly ported over to Quick Basic 4.5 which allowed for more memory usage, faster execution, and the ability to spawn external modules. The BBS gained a self-registration process, new games, user to user email, and a limited message base. The ability to compile the source code and run it as an executable also greatly improved the uptime of the BBS.  The size quickly grew to larger than a Floppy disk could hold and a 20mb hard drive was installed on the BBS computer.
Active 1992-1994

WWIV 4.x
In 1994 StarDoc 134 started running WWIV 4.x.  WWIV written in C provided a much more expandable and robust base than the previous self-written QuickBasic software. The change allowed the BBS to run 3rd party doors or applications that expanded the capabilities of the BBS. A True message base was installed and file transfers emerged. The BBS was also upgraded to a 386/16 MHz computer with 4mb of ram with 40mbs of storage. As WWIV evolved so did StarDoc 134; doors and modules were updated to expand the BBS. Eventually several modems were installed making the BBS multi-user and to establish a full internet connection for its user base. The BBS continued to run from 1994 until late 1999. In 1999 StarDoc 134 Closed its doors due to the increased use of the internet and lack of support for dial-up based BBS's.
Active 1994-1999

WWIV 5.x
Running on a new fast Pentium 90 MHz, 16mb of memory, 500mb hard drive and screaming fast 56k modem StarDoc 134 briefly re-opened its doors in 2003 with WWIV under a telnet hack. Unfortunately however shutdown due to heavy problems with system stability. In 2005 StarDoc 134 once again threw open its doors, attempting to run an early port of WWIV 5.00 Under Linux, but again due to heavy software problems with WWIV 5 under Linux the board was forced to make a change.
Active 2003-2005

EleBBS
In late 2005 a new BBS Package was decided on, ELEBBS.  This BBS software ran completely under Linux, and tho written in Pascal which the SysOp considered a step back, was a fully formed and working base. The BBS required little modification to make publicly accessible. To further expand the capabilities of the BBS, DOSEMU and some complex scripts were used to continue to run BBS favorite DOOR games. Currently StarDoc 134 is still running under a modified Linux EleBBS and DOS hybrid system. Allowing the BBS to provide both new Linux applications and services as well as classic DOS services and applications.
Active 2005-2020

WWIV 5.5+
The return to the nostalgic roots of WWIV was accomplished during the 2020 COVID-19 Pandemic lockdown. The isolation spurred a  significant increase in the development of the BBS software packages, and support utilities necessary for the transition back to WWIV. The public facing BBS was transitioned in June 2020. 
Active 2020-Present

History in community

StarDoc 134 was used as a testbed for many new modifications and program changes to the WWIV BBS community, submitting many mods over the 6 years that it ran WWIV. The BBS also was a registration point for the software brand RAMSOFT which provided a number of BBS door programs and SysOp Utilities. The BBS allowed users to process automated online registration via credit cards for instant registration. StarDoc 134 was one of the first and only WWIV BBS's to support online credit card processing for software.

StarDoc 134 was also one of the few BBS's that introduced true internet mail and basic web access to its users free of charge. The BBS had a dedicated SLIP connection to the internet. Email addressers were enumerated and often hard to remember, (RamMan#StarDoc134@inet.wwivnode.net for example). Despite the difficult internet email names, the feature became very popular with thousands of local users who could not afford to purchase internet mail themselves.  The board also allowed access to Usenet groups and limited text web browsing.  All internet functions were handled by a UNIX server located at Fresno State University.

Many C and Assembly libraries that were written to expand the functions of the BBS were later used in future versions of door programs and internet email integrations.

References

External links
 StarDoc 134 Home
 StarDoc 134 Web Portal
 EleBBS Home
 WWIV BBS Home

Bulletin board system software
DOS software
Linux network-related software